Canal du Segond, also known as Canal Pekoa and in English Segond Channel, literally "Second Channel," separates the island of Aore from the city of Luganville on main island of Espiritu Santo, Vanuatu.

The channel was the location of the United States Navy's Naval Advance Base Espiritu Santo during World War II. The channel was a major anchorage for vessels during the war.

References

Geography of Vanuatu